IFPO may refer to:

International Foundation for Protection Officers
Institut français du Proche-Orient; the French Institute of the Near East